El Anunciador was a Spanish language newspaper that was published in the then Crown colony (now British overseas territory) of Gibraltar between 1885 and 1940. It was the most read newspaper in Gibraltar and in the Campo de Gibraltar.

References

External links

Spanish-language newspapers
Newspapers published in Gibraltar
Publications established in 1885
Publications disestablished in 1940
1885 establishments in the British Empire